Box jellyfish (class Cubozoa) are cnidarian invertebrates distinguished by their box-like (i.e. cube-shaped) body. Some species of box jellyfish produce potent venom delivered by contact with their tentacles. Stings from some species, including Chironex fleckeri, Carukia barnesi, Malo kingi, and a few others, are extremely painful and often fatal to humans.

Taxonomy and systematics 

At least 51 species of box jellyfish were known as of 2018. These are grouped into two orders and eight families. A few new species have since been described, and it is likely that additional undescribed species remain.

Cubozoa represents the smallest cnidarian class with approximately 50 species.

Class Cubozoa
 Order Carybdeida
 Family Alatinidae
 Family Carukiidae
 Family Carybdeidae
 Family Tamoyidae
 Family Tripedaliidae
 Order Chirodropida
 Family Chirodropidae
 Family Chiropsalmidae
 Family Chiropsellidae

Description 

The medusa form of a box jellyfish has a squarish, box-like bell, from which its name is derived. From each of the four lower corners of this hangs a short pedalium or stalk which bears one or more long, slender, hollow tentacles. The rim of the bell is folded inwards to form a shelf known as a velarium which restricts the bell's aperture and creates a powerful jet when the bell pulsates.

In the center of the underside of the bell is a mobile appendage called the manubrium which somewhat resembles an elephant's trunk. At its tip is the mouth. The interior of the bell is known as the gastrovascular cavity. It is divided by four equidistant septa into a central stomach and four gastric pockets. The eight gonads are located in pairs on either side of the four septa. The margins of the septa bear bundles of small gastric filaments which house nematocysts and digestive glands and help to subdue prey. Each septum is extended into a septal funnel that opens onto the oral surface and facilitates the flow of fluid into and out of the animal.

The box jellyfish's nervous system is more developed than that of many other jellyfish. They possess a nerve ring around the base of the bell that coordinates their pulsing movements, a feature found elsewhere only in the crown jellyfish. Whereas some other jellyfish have simple pigment-cup ocelli, box jellyfish are unique in the possession of true eyes, complete with retinas, corneas and lenses. Their eyes are set in clusters called rhopalia, located in pockets halfway up the outer, flat surfaces of the bell. Each contains two rhopalial ocelli with lenses, one directed upwards and the other downwards and inwards towards the manubrium. This enables the animal to see specific points of light, as opposed to simply distinguishing between light and dark. Box jellyfish also have twenty ocelli (simple eyes) that do not form images, but detect light and dark; they therefore have a total of twenty-four eyes. Near the rhopalia are statoliths which detect gravitational pull and help the animal to orient itself.

Box jellyfish also display complex, probably visually-guided behaviors such as obstacle avoidance and fast directional swimming. Research indicates that, owing to the number of rhopalial nerve cells and their overall arrangement, visual processing and integration at least partly happen within the rhopalia of box jellyfish. The complex nervous system supports a relatively advanced sensory system compared to other jellyfish, and box jellyfish have been described as having an active, fish-like behavior.

Its weight can reach . However, the thumbnail-sized Irukandji is a box jellyfish, and lethal despite its small size. There are about 15 tentacles on each corner. Each tentacle has about 500,000 cnidocytes, containing nematocysts, a harpoon-shaped microscopic mechanism that injects venom into the victim. Many different kinds of nematocysts are found in cubozoans.

Distribution 
Although the notoriously dangerous species of box jellyfish are largely restricted to the tropical Indo-Pacific region, various species of box jellyfish can be found widely in tropical and subtropical oceans, including the Atlantic Ocean and the east Pacific Ocean, with species as far north as California (Carybdea confusa), the Mediterranean Sea (Carybdea marsupialis) and Japan (such as Chironex yamaguchii), and as far south as South Africa (for example, Carybdea branchi) and New Zealand (such as Copula sivickisi). There are three known species in Hawaiian waters, all from the genus Carybdea: C. alata, C. rastoni, and C. sivickisi. Within these tropical and subtropical environments, box jellyfish tend to reside closer to shore. They have been spotted in near-shore habitats such as mangroves, coral reefs, kelp forests, and sandy beaches.

Ecology

Age and growth 
It has been found that the statoliths, which are composed of calcium sulfate hemihydrate, exhibit clear sequential incremental layers, thought to be laid down on a daily basis. This has enabled researchers to estimate growth rates, ages, and age to maturity. In the wild, the box jellyfish will live up to 3 months, but can survive up to seven or eight months in a science lab tank.

Behavior 
The box jellyfish actively hunts its prey (small fish), rather than drifting as do true jellyfish.

The venom of cubozoans is distinct from that of scyphozoans, and is used to catch prey (small fish and invertebrates, including prawns and bait fish) and for defence from predators, which include the butterfish, batfish, rabbitfish, crabs (blue swimmer crab) and various species of turtle including the  hawksbill sea turtle and flatback sea turtle. It seems that sea turtles are unaffected by the stings because they seem to relish box jellyfish.

Danger to humans

Although unspecified species of box jellyfish have been called in newspapers "the world's most venomous creature" and the deadliest creature in the sea, only a few species in the class have been confirmed to be involved in human deaths; some species are not harmful to humans, possibly delivering a sting that is no more than painful.

Australia
In Australia Hugo Flecker, who worked on various venomous animal species and poisonous plants, was concerned at the unexplained deaths of swimmers. He identified the cause as the box jellyfish later named Chironex fleckeri. In 1945, he described another jellyfish envenoming which he named the "Irukandji Syndrome", later identified as caused by the box jellyfish Carukia barnesi.

In Australia, fatalities are most often caused by the largest species of this class of jellyfish, Chironex fleckeri, which is certainly one of the world's most venomous creatures. After severe Chironex fleckeri stings, cardiac arrest can occur quickly, within just two minutes.

In Australia, C. fleckeri has caused at least 79 deaths since the first report in 1883, but even in this species most encounters appear to result only in mild envenoming. While most recent deaths in Australia have been in children, including a 14-year old who died in February 2022, which is linked to their smaller body mass, in February 2021, a 17-year-old boy died about 10 days after being stung while swimming at a beach on Queensland's western Cape York.  The previous fatality was in 2007.

At least two deaths in Australia have been attributed to the thumbnail-sized Irukandji box jellyfish. People stung by these may suffer severe physical and psychological symptoms, known as Irukandji syndrome. Nevertheless, most victims do survive, and out of 62 people treated for Irukandji envenomation in Australia in 1996, almost half could be discharged home with few or no symptoms after 6 hours, and only two remained hospitalized approximately a day after they were stung.

Preventative measures in Australia include nets deployed on beaches to keep jellyfish out, and jugs of vinegar placed along swimming beaches to be used for rapid first aid.

Hawaii: research and dangers
Researchers at the University of Hawaii's Department of Tropical Medicine found the venom causes cells to become porous enough to allow potassium leakage, causing hyperkalemia, which can lead to cardiovascular collapse and death as quickly as within 2 to 5 minutes.

In Hawaii, box jellyfish numbers peak approximately seven to ten days after a full moon, when they come near the shore to spawn. Sometimes, the influx is so severe that lifeguards have closed infested beaches, such as Hanauma Bay, until the numbers subside.

Malaysia, Philippines, Japan, Thailand, and Texas
In parts of the Malay Archipelago, the number of lethal cases is far higher than in Australia. In the Philippines, an estimated 20–40 people die annually from Chirodropid stings, probably owing to limited access to medical facilities and antivenom.

The recently discovered and very similar Chironex yamaguchii may be equally dangerous, as it has been implicated in several deaths in Japan. It is unclear which of these species is the one usually involved in fatalities in the Malay Archipelago.

Warning signs and first aid stations have been erected in Thailand following the death of a 5-year-old French boy in August 2014. A woman died in July 2015 after being stung off Ko Pha Ngan, and another at Lamai Beach at Ko Samui on 6 October 2015.

In 1990, a 4-year-old child died after being stung by Chiropsalmus quadrumanus at Galveston Island, Texas, on the Gulf of Mexico. Either this species or Chiropsoides buitendijki is considered the likely perpetrator of two deaths in West Malaysia.

Protection and treatment

Protective clothing
Wearing pantyhose, full body lycra suits, dive skins, or wetsuits is an effective protection against box jellyfish stings. The pantyhose were formerly thought to work because of the length of the box jellyfish's stingers (nematocysts), but it is now known to be related to the way the stinger cells work. The stinging cells on a box jellyfish's tentacles are not triggered by touch, but by chemicals found on skin, which are not present on the hose's outer surface, so the jellyfish's nematocysts do not fire.

First aid for stings

Once a tentacle of the box jellyfish adheres to skin, it pumps nematocysts with venom into the skin, causing the sting and agonizing pain. Flushing with vinegar is used to deactivate undischarged nematocysts to prevent the release of additional venom. A 2014 study reported that vinegar also increased the amount of venom released from already-discharged nematocysts; however, this study has been criticized on methodological grounds.

Vinegar is made available on Australian beaches and in other places with venomous jellyfish.

Removal of additional tentacles is usually done with a towel or gloved hand, to prevent secondary stinging. Tentacles can still sting if separated from the bell, or after the creature is dead. Removal of tentacles may cause unfired nematocysts to come into contact with the skin and fire, resulting in a greater degree of envenomation.

Although commonly recommended in folklore and even some papers on sting treatment, there is no scientific evidence that urine, ammonia, meat tenderizer, sodium bicarbonate, boric acid, lemon juice, fresh water, steroid cream, alcohol, cold packs, papaya, or hydrogen peroxide will disable further stinging, and these substances may even hasten the release of venom. Heat packs have been proven for moderate pain relief. The use of pressure immobilization bandages, methylated spirits, or vodka is generally not recommended for use on jelly stings.

Possible antidotes in humans

In 2011, researchers at the University of Hawaii announced that they had developed an effective treatment against the stings of Hawaiian box jellyfish by "deconstructing" the venom contained in their tentacles. Its effectiveness was demonstrated in the PBS Nova episode "Venom: Nature's Killer", originally shown on North American television in February 2012. Their research found that injected zinc gluconate prevented the disruption of red blood cells and reduced the toxic effects on the cardiac activity of research mice. It was later found that copper gluconate was even more effective. A cream containing copper gluconate has been produced, to be applied to inhibit the injected venom; although it is used by U.S. military divers, evidence that it is effective in humans is only anecdotal.

In April 2019, a team of researchers at the University of Sydney announced that they had found a possible antidote to Chironex fleckeri venom that would stop pain and skin necrosis if administered within 15 minutes of being stung. The research was the result of work done with CRISPR whole genome editing in which the researchers selectively deactivated skin-cell genes until they were able to identify ATP2B1, a calcium transporting ATPase, as a host factor supporting cytotoxicity. The research showed the therapeutic use of existing drugs targeting cholesterol in mice, although the efficacy of the approach had not been demonstrated in humans.

References

External links 
 Cubozoa classification

 
Medusozoa
Venomous animals
Cnidarians of the Pacific Ocean
Cnidarians of the Indian Ocean